Public housing in Philadelphia is a significant portion of the overall housing stock in Philadelphia.  Most public housing is operated by the Philadelphia Housing Authority. On average, a Philadelphia public housing development is 69% African American, 26% Hispanic, and 5% White and other.

List of public housing projects
Passyunk Homes South Philadelphia (demolished)
Tasker Homes South Philadelphia, in the Grays Ferry neighborhood (demolished, replaced by Greater Grays Ferry Estates)
Richard Allen Homes North Philadelphia (demolished)
Blumberg Homes North Philadelphia (demolished)
James W. Johnson Homes North Philadelphia, in the Strawberry Mansion neighborhood
Riverview Courts South Philadelphia
Bartram Village Homes Southwest Philadelphia
Norris Homes North Philadelphia (apartment tower demolished)
Martin Luther King Homes South Philadelphia (demolished)
Hill Creek Apartments located in Northeast Philadelphia
8 Diamonds (AME) North Philadelphia
Morton Homes Germantown, Philadelphia
Abbottsford Homes North Philadelphia
Cambridge Homes North Philadelphia (demolished)
Richard Allen II North Philadelphia
Cecil B. Moore Homes North Philadelphia
Champlost Homes Germantown
Haverford Homes West Philadelphia
Lucien E. Blackwell Homes West Philadelphia
Oxford Village Homes Northeast Philadelphia
Sen. Herbert Arlene Homes North Philadelphia
Spring Garden Homes North Philadelphia
Westpark Homes West Philadelphia
Harrison Homes North Philadelphia
Fairhill Homes North Philadelphia
Arch Homes West Philadelphia
Queen Lane Apartments Germantown (demolished)
Raymond Rosen Homes North Philadelphia (demolished)
Mantua Hall Homes West Philadelphia (demolished)
Haddington Homes West Philadelphia
Mill Creek Plaza West Philadelphia (demolished)
Falls Ridge Homes East Falls
Wilson Park Homes South Philadelphia
Paschall Homes Southwest Philadelphia (demolished)
Liddonfield Homes Northeast Philadelphia (fully demolished)
Carl Mackley Houses, Juniata (now privately owned apartments)
White Hall Commons (Red Brick) Northeast Philadelphia (Frankford)

See also
Public housing
Public housing in the United States

External links
Philadelphia Housing Authority
"The Housing Problem in Philadelphia : a Lecture / by George W. Norris, President of the Philadelphia Housing Commission, Digital Library@Villanova University"

References

 
Municipal authorities in Pennsylvania